Statistics of the Swiss National League A in the 1993–94 football season.

Overview
It was contested by 12 teams, and Servette FC won the championship.

First stage

Table

Results

Second stage

Championship group

Table

Results

Promotion/relegation group

Table

Results

Sources
 Switzerland 1993–94 at RSSSF

Swiss Football League seasons
Swiss
1993–94 in Swiss football